The 1978–79 Durand Cup Final was the 74th final of the Durand Cup, the oldest football competition in India, and was contested between Kolkata giants East Bengal and Mohun Bagan on 17 January 1979 at the Ambedkar Stadium in New Delhi.

East Bengal won the final 3–0 to claim their 8th Durand Cup title. Surajit Sengupta, Mihir Bose and Tapan Das scored the three goals in the final as East Bengal lifted their eighth Durand Cup title.

Route to the final

Match

Summary
The Durand Cup final began at the Ambedkar Stadium in New Delhi on 17 January 1979 in front of a packed crowd as Kolkata giants East Bengal and Mohun Bagan faced each other in a Kolkata Derby. East Bengal reached their tenth Durand Cup final after defeating Mafatlal 2–0 in the semi-final, having won the tournament seven times previously in 1951, 1952, 1956, 1960, 1967, 1970, and 1972. Mohun Bagan reached their thirteenth Durand Cup final after they defeated JCT 4–2 in the semi-final, having won the tournament eight times previously in 1953, 1959, 1960, 1963, 1964, 1965, 1974, and 1977.

East Bengal dominated the proceedings from the start and took the lead early in the fifteenth minute when Surajit Sengupta dribbled past the Mohun Bagan defence to score with a powerful shot to make it 1–0. East Bengal doubled their lead in the thirty-sixth minute when Surajit Sengupta found Mihir Bose unmarked inside the box who made no errors to make it 2–0 before halftime. East Bengal scored their third with just four minutes remaining when Surajit Sengupta once again played a perfect pass to unmarked Tapan Das inside the box who made the scoreline 3–0 as East Bengal lifted their eighth Durand Cup title.

Details

References

External links
Durand Cup Finals

Durand Cup finals
1978–79 in Indian football
East Bengal Club matches
Mohun Bagan AC matches
Football competitions in Kolkata